On 17 March 2019, an earthquake measuring  5.6 struck the island of Lombok in West Nusa Tenggara, Indonesia. The earthquake triggered a landslide, killing six and injuring nearly 200 others.

Earthquake
BMKG attributed the earthquake to a local fault in the vicinity of Mount Rinjani. Aftershocks exceeding  5.0 were recorded.

Casualties
The earthquake caused a landslide and several rockfalls that struck a group of around forty tourists visiting a waterfall in East Lombok, killing six of them. Among the six deaths were two Malaysian tourists and a 14-year old boy. 26 other Malaysian tourists were also injured. Four people were injured when a house collapsed. In total the Indonesian National Board for Disaster Management reported 182 injuries in East and North Lombok regencies.

Damage
According to Indonesian Social Minister Agus Gumiwang Kartasasmita, 83,000 homes were damages; including 4,400 homes heavily damaged.

See also
List of earthquakes in 2019
List of earthquakes in Indonesia
5 August 2018 Lombok earthquake
19 August 2018 Lombok earthquake
July 2018 Lombok earthquake

References

External links
 

2019 disasters in Indonesia
2019 earthquakes
Earthquakes in Indonesia
Landslides in Indonesia